Prabhakara Rao was the fourth Bishop of Northern Karnataka of the Church of South India:

Notes

 

21st-century Anglican bishops in India
Church of South India clergy
Indian bishops
Indian Christian religious leaders
Anglican bishops of Northern Karnataka